The 2014–15 National League A season was the eighth ice hockey season of Switzerland's top hockey league, the National League A. Overall, it is the 77th season of Swiss professional hockey.

Teams

Regular season
Final standings.

Playoffs

Relegation playoffs – Playouts

1st round

2nd round

(3) Ambrì-Piotta vs. (4) Lakers

3rd round – League Qualification

Lakers vs. SCL Tigers

SCL Tigers won the series and were promoted to NLA and will play there in 2015–16 season. Rapperswil-Jona Lakers were relegated to National League B and will play there in 2015–16 season.

References

External links 
Official League Website  
Official League Website  

1
Swiss
National League (ice hockey) seasons